"All for One" is a song by English rock band the Stone Roses. It was released in the UK on 12 May 2016, over 20 years after their last release. The song debuted on Annie Mac's BBC Radio 1 show at shortly before 8pm on 12 May 2016 and was released immediately afterwards.

The song was released on the Stone Roses Vevo channel on YouTube, accompanied by an image of the song's title with a cut lemon representing the letter "O" of "One". The lemon has come to be associated with the band throughout their history, appearing on previous release cover art, in lyrics (Bye Bye Badman), as part of ticket designs, on posters and in 'teasers' of upcoming announcements, as in the run up to the release of the track.

Track listing
MP3 digital download 
 "All For One" – 3:36

CD single, Y4CDRO01
 "All For One" – 3:36

7" vinyl single, Y4LPRO01
 "All For One" – 3:36

Neither format included B-sides.

Personnel
Ian Brown – vocals
John Squire – guitar
Mani – bass guitar
Reni – drums and backing vocals

Charts

References

External links
The Definitive Stone Roses Discography entry

2016 songs
The Stone Roses songs
Songs written by John Squire
Songs written by Ian Brown
Song recordings produced by Paul Epworth
Songs written by Mani (musician)
Jangle pop songs